This is a list of all cricketers who have played first-class, List A or Twenty20 cricket for Bengal cricket team. Seasons given are first and last seasons; the player did not necessarily play in all the intervening seasons. Players in bold have played international cricket.

Last updated at the end of the 2015/16 season.

A
 Prabir Acharya, 1995/97
 James Alexander, 1936/37–1937/38
 Alok Pratap Singh, 2012/13–2015/16
 Boddupalli Amit, 2013/14
 Pravin Amre, 1996/97
 Madhav Apte, 1957/58
 Kapil Arora, 1994/95
 Monish Arora, 1998/99
 G Arratoon, 1935/36
 D Adhikary, 1980/81–1982/83

B
 Abhisek Banerjee, 2008/09
 Amit Banerjee, 2014/15
 Amitava Banerjee, 1996/97–2000/01
 Audrish Banerjee, 1992/93
 Jitendra Banerjee, 1935/36–1939/40
 Malay Banerjee, 1976/77–1980/81
 Montu Banerjee, 1941/42–1953/54
 Rabi Banerjee, 1970/71–1974/75
 Rohan Banerjee, 2008/09–2014/15
 Salil Banerjee, 1958/59–1961/62
 Sambaran Banerjee, 1973/74–1989/90
 Shute Banerjee, 1935/36–1936/37
 Souvik Banerjee, 1996/97
 Srimanta Banerjee, 1977/78–1978/79
 Suvojit Banerjee, 2014/15
 Subroto Banerjee, 1996/97–1998/99
 Tapan Banerjee, 1965/66–1982/83
 Udaybhanu Banerjee, 1978/79–1985/86
 Madhurya Barua, 1959/60
 Arijit Basu, 2000/01–2002/03
 Gitimoy Basu, 2010/11–2013/14
 Jayojit Basu, 2011/12–2013/14
 Jack Bedwell, 1940/41
 Stanley Behrend, 1935/36–1940/41
 Prakash Bhandari, 1958/59–1963/64
 Ramesh Bhatia, 1964/65–1971/72
 Aloke Bhattacharjee, 1970/71–1986/87
 Anil Bhattacharjee, 1953/54–1964/65
 Kamal Bhattacharjee, 1963/64
 Parthasarathi Bhattacharjee, 2011/12–2015/16
 Sanat Bhattacharjee, 1982/83
 Sankar Bhattacharjee, 1986/87
 Satyen Bhattacharjee, 1991/92
 Subir Bhattacharjee, 1980/81
 Tara Bhattacharjee, 1938/39–1940/41
 Arup Bhattacharya, 1980/81–1989/90
 Kamal Bhattacharya, 1935/36–1946/47
 Prasanta Bhattacharya, 1958/59–1959/60
 Tapan Bhattacharya, 1974/75
 Kalyan Biswas, 1955/56–1961/62
 Nripesh Biswas, 1963/64
 JS Blackburn, 1962/63
 Bapi Bose, 1935/36
 Ganapathi Bose, 1965/66
 Ganesh Bose, 1935/36–1942/43
 Gopal Bose, 1968/69–1977/78
 Kartick Bose, 1935/36–1951/52
 Parimal Bose, 1962/63
 Ranadeb Bose, 1998/99–2011/12
 Sivaji Bose, 1949/50–1957/58
 Sujit Bose, 1957/58–1959/60
 Sushil Bose, 1935/36–1948/49
 John Brocklebank, 1947/48
 Barun Burman, 1972/73–1986/87

C
 Paul Carey, 1944/45
 George Carter, 1937/38-1938/39
 Probir Chail, 1977/78-1982/83
 Prolay Chail, 1969/70-1975/76
 Samir Chakrabarti, 1971/72-1975/76
 Dibyendu Chakrabarty, 2003/04-2010/11
 Amitava Chakraborty, 2001/02-2007/08
 Debasis Chakraborty, 1984/85
 Gopal Chakraborty, 1954/55-1963/64
 Pritam Chakraborty, 2013/14-2014/15
 Rabindra Chanda, 1954/55-1963/64
 Sudip Chanda, 1998/99
 Pramod Chandila, 2015/16
 Nandu Chandravarkar, 1974/75
 Charanjit Singh, 1997/98-1999/00
 Anirban Chatterjee, 2003/04-2004/05
 Asoke Chatterjee, 1943/44-1947/48
 Champi Chatterjee, 1983/84
 Chandranath Chatterjee, 1986/87
 Nirmal Chatterjee, 1937/38-1954/55
 Premangsu Chatterjee, 1946/47-1959/60
 Sudip Chatterjee, 2009/10-2015/16
 Utpal Chatterjee, 1984/85-2004/05
 Writtick Chatterjee, 2013/14
 Rana Chowdhary, 2006/07-2007/08
 Abhishek Chowdhury, 2010/11
 Avik Chowdhury, 2007/08-2008/09
 Bikash Chowdhury, 1959/60-1962/63
 Kalyan Chowdhury, 1970/71-1978/79
 Nirode Chowdhury, 1944/45-1954/55
 David Cooper, 1942/43

D

E
 Abhimanyu Easwaran, 2013/14-2015/16
 Frederick Eccleston, 1939/40
 Eklak Ahmid, 2006/07

F
 Farsatullah, 1977/78-1981/82
 Humza Ferozie, 1995/96-2001/02
 Benjamin Frank, 1948/49-1953/54

G

H
 Nikhil Haldipur, 1994/95-2004/05
 Amherst Hammond, 1939/40
 Fred Harker, 1944/45
 Edward Harvey-Johnston, 1942/43-1943/44
 Haseen Ahmed, 1980/81
 Narendra Hirwani, 1996/97
 Amit Hore, 1987/88
 Alexander Hosie, 1935/36-1937/38
 Louis Hunt, 1935/36
 Hyder Ali, 1979/80

I
 Mohammad Idris, 1979/80
 Charles Inder, 1937/38

J
 Abdul Jabbar, 1938/39-1943/44
 Rusi Jeejeebhoy, 1965/66-1972/73
 Abhishek Jhunjhunwala, 2005/06-2012/13
 Jitendra Singh, 1987/88
 Munish Jolly, 1997/98
 Peter Judge, 1944/45

K
 Mohammed Kaif, 2020/21-
 Shrikant Kalyani, 1989/90-2000/01
 Ahmed Kamal, 1936/37-1940/41
 Sushil Kapoor, 1961/62-1963/64
 Saba Karim, 1994/95-2000/01
 Soumen Karmarkar, 1993/94
 Norman Kendrew, 1940/41
 Ramnath Kenny, 1961/62
 Keki Khambatta, 1935/36-1937/38
 Satish Khanna, 1950/51-1959/60
 Lester King, 1962/63 (played international cricket for West Indies)
 Rakesh Krishnan, 2004/05
 Satyendra Kuckreja, 1957/58-1963/64
 Amit Kuila, 2014/15
 Mukesh Kumar, 2015/16
 Ritam Kundu, 2004/05-2008/09
 Soumendranath Kundu, 1958/59-1968/69

L
 Alokendu Lahiri, 1994/95-2002/03
 Saurasish Lahiri, 1999/00-2014/15
 Arun Lal, 1981/82-1995/96
 Murtaza Lodhgar, 1997/98-2007/08
 Tom Longfield, 1935/36-1938/39

M

N
 Arnab Nandi, 2009/10-2013/14
 Palash Nandy, 1969/70-1983/84
 Pranob Nandy, 1979/80-1986/87
 Sunil Nandy, 1958/59
 Maharaja of Cooch Behar Jagaddipendra Narayan, 1942/43-1945/46
 Samarendra Nath, 1966/67-1967/68
 Naved Ahmed, 2015/16
 C. S. Nayudu, 1950/51-1951/52
 Pradeep Neogy, 1981/82
 John Nuttall, 1941/42

O
 Mohammad-Al Obaidullah, 1941/42
 Pragyan Ojha, 2015/16

P

R

S

T
 Cyril Tamplin, 1942/43
 James Taylor, 1952/53
 Anurag Tiwari, 2015/16
 OP Tiwari, 1994/95
 Manoj Tiwary, 2003/04-2015/16

V
 Prashant Vaidya, 1992/93-1995/96
 Paul van der Gucht, 1935/36-1947/48
 Ajay Varma, 1986/87-1997/98
 Veer Pratap Singh, 2011/12-2015/16
 Raja Venkatraman, 1980/81-1991/92
 Vivek Singh, 2012/13-2013/14

W
 John Warren, 1935/36
 Robin Waters, 1962/63
 Desmond Whittaker, 1954/55

Y
 Vishal Yadav, 1999/00

Notes

References

Bengal cricketers

cricketers